Savage is a surname that may refer to:

A–C
Adam Savage, American television co-host of MythBusters
Agnes Yewande Savage (1906 – 1964), the first woman in West Africa to train and qualify in orthodox medicine and also the first West African woman to receive a university degree 
Alan Savage (disambiguation), several people
Alan Savage (football chairman), chairman of Scottish Premier League team, Inverness Caledonian Thistle
Alan Savage (novelist), one of the many pseudonyms of Christopher Nicole
Alfred Savage (1903–1980), former colonial Governor of British Guiana
Alfred H. Savage, retired public transit manager, Canada and United States
Andrea Savage (born 1975), American actress
Anne Savage, Baroness Berkeley (c. 1496 – before 1546), lady-in-waiting to Anne Boleyn, second wife of Henry VIII of England
Ann Savage (1921–2008), American film actress
Anne Savage (disambiguation), several people
Archie Savage (1914–2003), African-American dancer, choreographer, and film and theatre actor
Augusta Savage (1892–1962), African-American sculptor of the Harlem Renaissance
Bas Savage (born 1982), professional English footballer
Ben Savage (born 1980), American film and TV actor
Booth Savage, Canadian film actor
Brian K. Savage (born 1955), State of Vermont representative
Brian Savage (born 1971), retired Canadian professional ice hockey left winger
Bruce Charles Savage (1906–1993), former United States Public Housing Authority Commissioner under President Dwight D. Eisenhower
Candace Savage, Canadian nature writer
Carla Savage, American computer scientist and mathematician
Carrie Savage, American voice actress
Chantay Savage, R&B/dance singer
Charles Roscoe Savage (1832–1909), British-born landscape and portrait photographer
Charlie Savage, newspaper reporter
Charlie Savage (footballer) (born 2003), Welsh association footballer

D–K
Dan Savage, sex advice columnist
Darnell Savage Jr., American football player
Derek Savage (poet) (1917–2007), pacifist poet and critic
Derek Savage (Gaelic footballer), former inter-county Gaelic football player for Galway
Donald Savage (disambiguation), several people
Doug Savage, Canadian born author and cartoonist – Savage Chickens
Dudley Savage (1920–2008), British BBC radio presenter
Dutch Savage, former professional wrestler
Edward Savage (footballer) (born 1989), English actor
Edwin Sidney Savage (1862–1947), English clergyman
Eugene Savage (1883–1978), American painter and sculptor
Ezra P. Savage (1842–1920), American politician and 16th governor of Nebraska
Fred Savage (born 1976), American actor and television director
Frederick Savage (disambiguation), several people
Gary Savage (disambiguation), several people
George Savage (physician) (1842–1921), British physician
Gus Savage (born 1925), former Democratic member of the United States House of Representatives
Herschel Savage (born 1955), American pornographic actor and director
Jack Savage, former Major League Baseball pitcher
James (Jim) Savage (disambiguation), several people
Jane Savage (1752/3–1824), English harpsichordist and composer
Jay M. Savage (born 1928), American herpetologist
Joel Savage (born 1969), retired professional ice hockey player
John (Jon) Savage (disambiguation)
Josh Savage (born 1980), American football defensive lineman

L–Q
Lara Mussell Savage, a two time world champion in the sport Ultimate
Leonard Jimmie Savage (1917–1971), American mathematician and statistician
Levi Savage Jr. (1820–1910), prominent figure in the history of The Church of Jesus Christ of Latter-day Saints
M. Susan Savage (born 1952), American Democratic politician and 29th Secretary of State of Oklahoma
Mark Savage (Australian film director) (born 1962), Australian film/television screenwriter and film director
Mark Savage (American playwright), American screenwriter
Marshall Savage, advocate of space travel and founder of the Living Universe Foundation
Martin Savage (1898–1919), officer in the Dublin Brigade of the Irish Republican Army
Matt Savage (born 1992), American autistic savant musician
Matt Savage (musician) (born 1972), English actor and musician
Matt Savage (poker director), American poker tournament director
Michael Joseph Savage (1872–1940), first Labour Party prime minister of New Zealand
Michael Savage (born 1942), American radio host, author, and conservative political commentator
Michael Savage (politician) (born 1960), a Canadian politician
Minot Judson Savage (1841–1918), American Unitarian minister and author
Norman Savage, British film editor
Pat Savage (1882–1969), Scottish footballer
Patrick Savage (judge), Niuean chief justice
Patrick Savage (composer/musician), Australian-born film composer and violinist
Paul Savage (disambiguation)
Phil Savage (born 1965), former Senior Vice President and General Manager of the Cleveland Browns
Philip Henry Savage (1868–1899) poet, son of Minot Judson Savage

R–Z
Randy Savage (1952–2011), the ring name of American professional wrestler Randy Poffo
Reggie Savage (born 1970), former Canadian ice hockey player
Richard Savage (disambiguation)
Rick Savage (born 1960), bassist and founder of the English rock band, Def Leppard
Robbie Savage (born 1974), Welsh professional footballer
Robbie Savage (footballer born 1960), English footballer who played as a midfielder
Robert Savage (disambiguation)
Roz Savage (born 1967), first woman to row solo across three oceans, environmental campaigner
Russell Savage, former independent member for the Victorian Legislative seat of Mildura
Scott Savage, drummer
Seán Savage (1965–1988), member (volunteer) of the Provisional Irish Republican Army
Steele Savage (1898 or 1900–1970), American illustrator
Stefan Savage (born 1969), American computer science researcher
Stephanie Savage, producer of Wonderland Sound and Vision
Swede Savage (1946–1973), American race car driver
Ted Savage (footballer) (born 1912), former English footballer for Liverpool
Thomas/Tom Savage (disambiguation)
Tiwa Savage, Nigerian Musician
Tracie Savage (born 1962), American actress and journalist
William Alfred Savage (1912–1942), English able seaman in the Royal Navy and recipient of the Victoria Cross
William Savage (1720–1789), English composer, organist, and singer
 Xavier Savage (born 2002), Canberra Raiders throbber

Fictional characters 
Bill Savage, character in the comic, 2000 AD
Doc Savage, pulp hero of the 1930s and 1940s
Ethel P. Savage, the protagonist of the 1950 play The Curious Savage
Gary Savage, scientist in Deus Ex
Lily Savage, drag character performed by Paul O'Grady
Patricia Savage, cousin of fictional hero Doc Savage
Scandal Savage, daughter of the fictional Vandal Savage
Vandal Savage, supervillain in the DC Comics Universe

See also 
Savage (disambiguation)
Sauvage (disambiguation), French for "savage"
Savige (disambiguation)
Savidge (disambiguation)

English-language surnames